Denmark competed at the 2022 World Aquatics Championships in Budapest, Hungary from 17 June to 3 July.

Swimming

Denmark entered 5 swimmers.

Men

Women

References

Nations at the 2022 World Aquatics Championships
Denmark at the World Aquatics Championships
2022 in Danish sport